Longeville-sur-Mer (literally Longeville on Sea) is a commune in the Vendée department in the Pays de la Loire region in western France.

Geography
North of the Marais Poitevin, Longeville-sur-Mer is situated in the south of the Vendée department, along the Côte de Lumière (English: Coast of Light). The commune gives its name to a coastal forest of pines and oaks. The town's central village lies one kilometre inland, but the municipality itself comprises three smaller seaside resorts, these beings the hamlets of 'Le Bouil', 'Le Rocher' and 'Les Conches'. A celebrated surf spot, named Bud Bud, is found at Les Conches, whilst the road leading from the beach to the nearby town of Angles passes through a marsh, from which one may observe wild birds, including storks.

Demographics
As of the 2008 census, Longeville-sur-Mer had a population of 2,328 (an increase of 18% as compared to 1999). The commune ranks as the 4,337th largest in France (4,676th in 1999) and the 72nd largest of the 282 communes in the department.

See also
Communes of the Vendée department

References

Communes of Vendée
Populated coastal places in France